Dear Boys is a sports manga by Hiroki Yagami, published by Kodansha in Monthly Shōnen Magazine. The story concerns the progress of the Mizuho High School basketball team as it attempts to win the prefectural championship. It also deals heavily with the relationship between the players on the team, especially the two main characters Kazuhiko Aikawa and Takumi Fujiwara.

Chapters

Dear Boys

Dear Boys: The Early Days

Dear Boys: Act2

Dear Boys: Act3

Dear Boys: Over Time

Dear Boys: Act4

References

External links

Dear Boys